Richard Dobbs Spaight Jr. (1796November 17, 1850) was an American politician and planter who served as the 27th governor of North Carolina from 1835 to 1836. His father, Richard Dobbs Spaight, served as the eighth governor of North Carolina from 1792 to 1795.

Biography
Born in New Bern, North Carolina, Richard Dobbs Spaight  Jr. was the son of Richard Dobbs Spaight. He was orphaned in 1802, when his father was killed in a duel; he later attended the University of North Carolina, graduating in 1815. Spaight studied law and was admitted to the bar in 1818; he was elected to the North Carolina House of Commons in 1819 and the North Carolina Senate in 1820, where he served until being elected to the U.S. House of Representatives in 1823.

Defeated for re-election to Congress, Spaight returned to the state legislature. He made repeated unsuccessful attempts to run for governor, defeated in 1827 (by James Iredell Jr.), 1828 (by John Owen), 1830, 1831 (by Montfort Stokes) and 1832 (by David Swain). Spaight was finally successful in 1835, becoming the last governor elected by the General Assembly under the North Carolina Constitution of 1776. As governor, he opposed state-funded internal improvements. Under the new North Carolina Constitution of 1835, Spaight ran in the first statewide popular election for governor, but was defeated by Edward B. Dudley. The Spaights were the first father and son to serve as governor. W. Kerr Scott and Robert W. Scott later achieved the same distinction. Spaight retired to his farm near New Bern.

Arms

See also
 List of Freemasons

References

External links
 
 Richard Dobbs Spaight Jr. at The Historical Marker Database (HMdb.org)
 Richard Dobbs Spaight Jr. at the National Governors Association
 Richard Dobbs Spaight Jr. at The Political Graveyard
 
 

1796 births
1850 deaths
19th-century American lawyers
19th-century American politicians
American Freemasons
American lawyers admitted to the practice of law by reading law
American people of English descent
American people of Irish descent
Burials in North Carolina
Deaths in North Carolina
Democratic-Republican Party members of the United States House of Representatives from North Carolina
Democratic Party governors of North Carolina
Farmers from North Carolina
North Carolina lawyers
Politicians from New Bern, North Carolina
University of North Carolina at Chapel Hill alumni